The 2020 West Virginia Mountaineers football team represented West Virginia University during the 2020 NCAA Division I FBS football season. The Mountaineers played their home games at the Mountaineer Field at Milan Puskar Stadium, in Morgantown, West Virginia, and competed in the Big 12 Conference. They were led by second-year head coach Neal Brown.

Previous season
The Mountaineers finished the 2019 season with a 5–7 record, 3–6 in Big 12 play, failing to earn bowl eligibility.

Offseason

Coaching changes
Offensive coordinator Matt Moore was promoted to assistant head coach, and was replaced in his role as offensive coordinator by Penn State wide receivers coach Gerad Parker. Parker also replaced Xavier Dye, who departed for South Florida, as wide receivers coach. Additionally, the Mountaineers hired Jeff Koonz from Ole Miss to serve as inside linebackers and special team coach and later became co-defensive coordinator.

On July 22, Defensive coordinator Vic Koenning parted ways with West Virginia after allegations of mistreatment by West Virginia players. To replace him, they promoted three defensive coaches to become co-defensive coordinators: Jordan Lesley, Jahmile Addae, and Jeff Koonz. They also moved linebackers coach Dontae Wright to safeties coach along with promoting analyst Jeff Casteel to outside linebackers coach.

Preseason

Big 12 media days
The Big 12 media days were held on July 21–22, 2020 in a virtual format due to the COVID-19 pandemic.

Big 12 media poll

Schedule

Spring game
The West Virginia football spring "Blue-Gold game" was canceled due to COVID-19.

Regular season
West Virginia released its 2020 schedule on October 21, 2019. The 2020 schedule originally consisted of 7 home games, 4 away games, and 1 neutral-site game in the regular season. The Mountaineers were to host two non-conference games against Eastern Kentucky and Maryland, and play a non-conference neutral site game against Florida State in the Chick-fil-A Kickoff Game in Mercedes-Benz Stadium in Atlanta. West Virginia was to host Kansas State, TCU, Kansas, Oklahoma, and Baylor; and travel to Texas Tech, Texas, Oklahoma State, and Iowa State in regular-season conference play.

The Mountaineers' games against Florida State, scheduled for September 5, and Maryland, scheduled for September 19, were canceled due to the COVID-19 pandemic.

Schedule Source:

Coaching staff

Game summaries

vs. Eastern Kentucky

at Oklahoma State

vs. Baylor

vs. Kansas

at Texas Tech

vs. Kansas State (Homecoming)

at Texas

vs. TCU

vs. Oklahoma

at Iowa State

Rankings

Players drafted into the NFL

References

West Virginia
West Virginia Mountaineers football seasons
Liberty Bowl champion seasons
West Virginia Mountaineers football